Valentine Alexius Schoonberg a Bavarian retail merchant and/or a missionary based at the Cape of Good Hope in South Africa . He was suspected of being a co-conspirator with individual/s being held (around October 1800) at the Castle after sentencing for capital crimes.  He printed the first known book (title plus 7 pages in paper covers) in the Cape, it is also the earliest known printed religious publication in South Africa. It was a translation, from English to Dutch, of a letter brought out in 1799 by Dr. J. T. van der Kemp of the London Missionary Society to their followers in the Cape, entitled "Brief van het Zendelings Genootschap te London aan de Godsdienst-lievende ingezetenen van de Caap de Goede Hoop".

It is possible that he made use of J.C. Ritter's press. Only one copy is known to exist and is in the South African Library.

See also
Global spread of the printing press

Further reading
 Wayback Machine copy of the "Records of the Cape Colony 1793-1831 copied for the Cape government, from the manuscript documents in the Public Record Office". Private Letter from Sir George Yonge to the Right Honourable Henry Dundas, Oct 22 1800 search for Schoonberg to find the relevant letter.

References

Year of death missing
South African printers
People from the Kingdom of Bavaria
Year of birth missing